Khorovats is an Armenian barbecue. The meat may be marinated before grilling, but it does not have to be. It can be made with lamb, pork, beef, chicken, fish, or even veal. This is generally a dish reserved for "festive occasions".

Etymology
The word "խորոված" khorovats means "grilled" in Armenian and comes from the verb "խորովել" khorovel (to grill).

Description

Khorovats can be made with lamb, pork, beef, chicken, or less commonly veal. Some type of vegetable is usually served with the meat. A common preparation for green vegetables like asparagus or green beans is to fry them and combine with whipped eggs, a dish which resembles scrambled eggs with vegetables.

A typical khorovats is made of chunks of meat grilled on a shampoor (շամփուր) or skewer, although steaks or chops grilled without skewers may be also used.

2006 book Armenian Food: Fact, Fiction & Folklore gives three tips for making good khorovats:
The distance between the fire and the skewers should be approximately 12 to 15 centimeters (about 6 inches)
The largest pieces of meat should always go in the middle, where there is more heat for the fire
Shampoors (skewers) should be placed close together to concentrate the heat from the cooking fire

In Armenia itself, khorovats is often made with the bone still in the meat (as lamb or pork chops). 

Proshian Street in Yerevan is dubbed "Barbecue Street" by foreigners, because many khorovats restaurants are located on the street.

In popular culture
In his The Travels of Sir John Chardin in Persia and the Orient 17th-century French traveler Jean Chardin wrote:

In a scene from the 1976 Soviet film When September Comes, prominent Armenian actor Armen Dzhigarkhanyan (Levon) makes khorovats with his grandson in the balcony of his daughter's Moscow apartment. His neighbors see smoke coming out of the balcony and call the firemen, but when a fireman arrives, everything settles down and all the neighbors gather at Levon's house to enjoy the dish.

Since 2009, an annual festival of khorovats has been held in Akhtala in northern Armenia. In 2012, John A. Heffern, the US ambassador to Armenia, was among 15,000 guests of the festival.

References

Sources
 

Armenian cuisine
National dishes
Armenian culture
Meat dishes